Mikhail Kuzmich Lukonin (1918-1976) was a Soviet Russian poet. He was born in Astrakhan province and in his youth worked in the Stalingrad Tractor Plant. He started publishing poetry in his teens. He attended the Gorky Institute of Literature from 1937 to 1941. He was a veteran of the Soviet-Finnish War and also worked as a war correspondent in the Great Patriotic War. In October 1941, he was wounded in the village of Negino. The following year, he joined the Communist Party.

Initially influenced by the work of Vladimir Mayakovsky, Lukonin forged his own style later on. Much of his poetry about the front was compiled in a volume titled Heartbeat (1948). He was known for longer poems on the theme of postwar reconstruction. He won a Stalin Prize in 1949 for a poem titled “The Working Day,” and a State Prize in 1973 for the collection “Necessity”. He was elected first secretary of the Moscow branch of the Union of Writers, but died soon after his appointment to this post.

His selected poetry was translated into English by Dorian Rottenberg and published by Progress Publishers.

He was married to a Russian actress Anna Antonenko-Lukonina.

References

Soviet writers
1918 births
1976 deaths